Lars-Erik Liedholm (5 April 1928 – 19 December 1996) was a Swedish actor, director and screenwriter.

Biography
Liedholm was born in Motala, Sweden. He graduated from Lund University in 1948 and studied 1951–1954 at Gothenburg Theatre Academy. In 1954–1955, he was theatre director at Wasa Theatre in Finland. He was theatre director at the East Gothland Theatre in 1956–1959, where he also was theatre director in 1982–1985, Helsingborg City Theatre in 1960–1964 and the Royal Dramatic Theatre in 1964–1969.

From 1977–1982, Liedholm was married to actress and singer Birgit Carlstén. He died during 1996 in Stockholm

Filmography

Actor
All These Women (1964)
Den vita stenen (TV series, 1973)
August Strindberg: Ett liv (TV series, 1985)

Director
Juninatt (1965)
Familjen Ekbladh (TV series, 1971)

Screenwriter
 Hide and Seek (1963)
Familjen Ekbladh (TV series, 1971)

References

1928 births
1996 deaths
People from Motala Municipality
Swedish male actors
Swedish film directors
Swedish theatre directors
Lund University alumni
20th-century Swedish screenwriters
20th-century Swedish male writers